Łukasz Dumański (born 20 April 1983) is an Ivory Coast-born Polish-Canadian professional poker player who now resides in Canada.  In 2007, he won a World Series of Poker bracelet in the $1,500 Pot Limit Omaha Hi/Lo Split 8 or Better.  This was the first time this event was ever played at the World Series of Poker.

Up to 2008, Łukasz Dumanski had poker tournament winning of over $240,000.

World Series of Poker bracelets

References

1983 births
Living people
World Series of Poker bracelet winners
Canadian people of Polish descent
Ivorian emigrants to Canada
Sportspeople from Toronto